Hopea rugifolia is a tree in the family Dipterocarpaceae, native to Borneo. The specific epithet rugifolia means "wrinkled leaf", referring to the dried leaf.

Description
It has buttresses and stilt roots. The bark is smooth.

Distribution and habitat
Hopea rugifolia is endemic to Borneo.

References

rugifolia
Endemic flora of Borneo
Plants described in 2002